In Norse mythology, the Marmennill or Marbendill were mermen with the ability to prophesy the future. Its female counterpart was the Margygur.

References
Lesser creatures in Norse myths
Curious Myths of the Middle Ages, By Sabine Baring-Gould, Rivingtons, 1873, page 504 

Creatures in Norse mythology
Mermen
Prophecy